William Wallace Lambdin (October 25, 1861 – December 20, 1916) was a United States district judge of the United States District Court for the Southern District of Georgia.

Education and career

Born in Upson County, Georgia, Lambdin received an Artium Baccalaureus degree from the University of Georgia in 1879 and read law to enter the bar in 1888. He was in private practice in Atlanta, Georgia from 1888 to 1899, then in Barnesville, Georgia until 1906, and then in Waycross, Georgia from 1906 to 1915.

Federal judicial service

On March 3, 1915, Lambdin was nominated by President Woodrow Wilson to a new seat on the United States District Court for the Southern District of Georgia created by 38 Stat. 959. He was confirmed by the United States Senate on March 3, 1915, and received his commission the same day. Lambdin served in that capacity for little over a year and a half, until his death on December 20, 1916.

References

Sources
 

1861 births
1916 deaths
Judges of the United States District Court for the Southern District of Georgia
United States district court judges appointed by Woodrow Wilson
20th-century American judges
People from Upson County, Georgia
People from Barnesville, Georgia
People from Waycross, Georgia
United States federal judges admitted to the practice of law by reading law
19th-century American judges